Barry Hyam (born 9 September 1975) was an English cricketer. He was a right-handed batsman and a wicket-keeper. In his nine-year-long first-class career he played for both his home team of Essex, and Marylebone. Having represented the Essex Second XI for many years in the Second XI championship from the age of sixteen, he moved to the first-class team in 1993.

Having faced nearly three years without a first-class match, and not playing a single game throughout 1994, he returned to the Second XI side in 1995, but most impressed during 2000, when his industrious lower-middle order batting and top-quality performances behind the stumps aided Essex to promotion from Division Two of the County Championship.

Hyam has not played league cricket since his Second XI appearances for Essex in 2003.

References

External links
Barry Hyam at Cricket Archive 

1975 births
Essex cricketers
English cricketers
Living people
Marylebone Cricket Club cricketers
Wicket-keepers